The Kissinger Institute on China and the United States is a non-profit research organization dedicated to promoting greater understanding of issues in the relationship between the People's Republic of China and the United States and its impact on both countries and the world. It was inaugurated in 2008 and is part of the Woodrow Wilson International Center for Scholars. Its current director is Robert Daly.

Founding Council Members

American Co-Chairman
 Dr. Henry Kissinger, former Secretary of State and National Security Adviser

Chinese Co-Chairman
 Xu Kuangdi, former President of the Chinese Academy of Engineering and Mayor of Shanghai

Vice Chairman
 Philip Falcone, Senior Managing Director, Harbinger Capital Partners

American Founding Council Members
 Richard Adkerson, President and CEO, Freeport McMoRan Copper and Gold
 Maurice “Hank” Greenberg, chairman and CEO, C.V. Starr and Company
 Hon. Barbara Hackman Franklin, President and CEO, Barbara Franklin Enterprises; former US Secretary of Commerce
 Hon. Carla A. Hills, chairman and CEO, Hills & Company, International Consultants; former U.S. Secretary of Housing and Urban Development; former US Trader Representative
 David Metzner, Managing Partner, American Continental Group
 Dr. Alexander Mirtchev, Founder and President, Krull Corp.
 Indra Nooyi, chairman and CEO, PepsiCo, Inc.
 David O'Reilly, former chairman and CEI, Chevron Corporation
 Hon. Robert Rubin, Co-chairman, Council on Foreign Relations; former US Secretary of the Treasury and Director of the National Economic Council
 Hon. George P. Shultz, Distinguished Fellow, Hoover Institution; former US Secretary of Labor, Secretary of the Treasury, and Secretary of State

Chinese Founding Council Members
 Tung Chee-hwa, former Hong Kong Chief Executive, Vice Chairman of the National Committee of the 11th Chinese People's Political Consultative Conference, and President of the China-US Exchange Foundation in Hong Kong
 Zhou Wenzhong, former PRC Ambassador to the United States
 Yang Wenchang, President of the Chinese People's Institute of Foreign Affairs, former Vice Minister of Foreign Affairs and Ambassador to Singapore
 Chen Yonglong, Vice President of the Chinese People's Institute of Foreign Affairs, former PRC Ambassador to Jordan and Israel
 Yang Jiemian, President of the Shanghai Institutes for International Studies and brother of PRC Foreign Minister Yang Jiechi
 Gao Xiqing, Vice Chairman, President, and CIO of China Investment Corporation (CIC), the PRC's principal sovereign wealth fund with over $200 billion under management
 Fu Chengyu, President of China National Offshore Oil Corporation (CNOOC)
 Wei Jiafu, Executive President and CEO of China Ocean Shipping (Group) Company (COSCO), one of the largest liner shipping companies worldwide and the largest dry bulk carrier in China
 Xu Lejiang, Chairman of Baosteel Group Corporation, China's largest iron and steel conglomerate and the third largest steel producer in the world

Scholars
 Martin Dimitrov

References

External links
Kissinger Institute on China and the United States – Official site

2008 establishments in Washington, D.C.
China–United States relations
Organizations established in 2008
Henry Kissinger